The 1989 World Youth Baseball Championship was the inaugural edition of the under-15 international baseball competition held in Japan from 24 July to August 1989. Players aged 13 to 15 competed in the eight-nation round-robin tournament.

Squad

Brazil 
 Coach: Huguiyoski Sugeta
 Center fielder: Marcelo Takao Tanaka
 Right fielder: Ricardo Momose

Canada 
 Pitcher: Rob Peronne, Ray Solomon, Kevin Briand, Patrick Lussier, Stephane Chagnon, Martin Lavigne, Mario Rouleau, Patrick Dupuis
 Catcher: Andrew Halpenny, Jamie Dimitroff
 Infielder: Brad Robinson, J. J. Hyde, Neil Szeryk, Jody Brown, Alain Lachance, Pascal St. Pierre
 Outfielder: Louis Lachance, Dominic Therrien, John Evans, Chris Vetor
Two players were excluded from the above roster.

China 
 Gao Lijun

Japan 
 1st baseman: Kouta Soejima (副島孔太)
 3rd baseman: Kei Shibata 
 Shortstop: Akihito Suzuki (鈴木章仁)
 Ryuichi Sakamoto, Yota Tawa

South Korea 
Incomplete
 Catcher: Chang Sung Kook, Lee Jin Suk

Taiwan 
 Pithcher: 9洪邦政, 林怡宏, 林信助, 陳宗男, 吳俊良 (Wu Chun-liang)
 Catcher: 鄭文賢, 石金受, 王文智
 Infielder: 33陳慶國 (Chen Ching-kuo), 陳懷山, 曾信彰 (Tseng Hsin-chang), 洪啟峰, 陳光輝, 郭子偉
 Outfielder：游明傑, 18龐玉龍, 朱志強, 35藍德威
 Head coach: 陳友彬
 Assistant coaches: 劉明光、蔡景峰

United States 
Incomplete
 Widd Workman, Frank Harmer, Mike Rennack, Chris Smith
 Left fielder: Geoff Jenkins

Venezuela 
Incomplete
 Center fielder: Robert Marcano

Preliminary round 

There is only one game on 29 July. All the other teams were idle. 
The records until 27 July was Venezuela 3-0, China and Taiwan 2-1, the United States, Brazil, and Japan 1-1, South Korea 1-3, and Canad 0-3.

The United States became 2-2.
The results of the other matches are unknown.

Only Venezuela was ideal on 31 July.
After the matches of 31 July, the records are Japan and Taiwan 4-1, Venezuela and China 3-2, South Korea 3-3, the United States 2-3, Brazil 1-3, and Canada 0-5.

Some games were postponed by rain and later canceled because they would not affect teams' placing.
After the end of the round-robin matches, the records are Japan and Taiwan 5-1, China and Korea 4-3, Venezuela 3-4, the United States and Brazil 2-4, and Canada 0=5.

Placement matches  

The matches were held at 10:00 at Jingu Stadium

3rd-place match

Final

Final standings

All-Star Team 

 Right-handed pitcher: Wu Chun-liang (吳俊良) (TWN)
 Left-handed pitcher: Gao Lijun (CHN)
 Catcher: Chang Sung Kook (장성국) (KOR)
 1st baseman: Kouta Soejima (JPN) (副島孔太)
 2nd baseman: Tseng Hsin-chang (TWN) (曾信彰)
 3rd baseman: Kei Shibata (JPN)
 Shortstop: Akihito Suzuki (JPN) (鈴木章仁)
 Center fielder: Marcelo Takao Tanaka (BRA)
 Right fielder: Ricardo Momose (BRA)
 Left fielder: Geoff Jenkins (USA)

References

U-15 Baseball World Cup
15U Baseball World Cup
15U Baseball World Cup
15U Baseball World Cup
1989
15U Baseball World Cup
15U Baseball World Cup